Amulet was a hardcore punk band based in Oslo, Norway, formed in 1993 by Torgny Amdam and disbanded in 2007. During the 14 years they were active, they released four albums, three EPs and four 7" records. Blessed and Cursed is a compilation album of their best songs.

The Danger! Danger! album charted on 13th place on the Norwegian albums chart VG-lista.

Albums
 Amulet (1994)
 Engrave (1996)
 The Burning Sphere (1999)
 Freedom Fighters (2001)
 Danger! Danger! (2003)
 All That Is Solid Melts Into Air (2005)
 Blessed and Cursed (2007)

References

Norwegian hardcore punk groups
Musical groups established in 1993
1993 establishments in Norway
Musical groups disestablished in 2007
2007 disestablishments in Norway
Musical groups from Oslo